TGIF may refer to:

 Thank God It's Friday (disambiguation), a common expression.

Arts and media
 TGIF (TV programming block), a former two-hour programming block on the American television network ABC
 "Last Friday Night (T.G.I.F.)", a 2011 single by Katy Perry
 "T.G.I.F. (Thank God I'm Fresh)", a song from the Kid Cudi album Man on the Moon: The End of Day
 "T.G.I.F.", a song from the Lonestar album Let's Be Us Again (2004)
 "TGIF", a song from the Le Tigre album Feminist Sweepstakes

Science and technology
 Tgif (program), an interactive 2-D drawing tool under X11 for Unix and the file format it uses, .tgif
 Tactical Ground Intercept Facility, a US Military Intelligence collection platform
 Transforming growth interacting factor
 TGIF1, a protein that in humans is encoded by the TGIF1 gene
 TGIF2, a protein that in humans is encoded by the TGIF2 gene

Other uses
 T.G.I. Friday's, an American restaurant chain